Nikola Vasiljević (born 24 June 1996) is a Serbian professional footballer who plays as a goalkeeper for Red Star Belgrade.

Club career
Vasiljević started out at his hometown club Radnički Niš. He later switched to Sloboda Užice, being promoted to their senior squad in early 2013. In late summer 2014, Vasiljević returned to Radnički Niš and remained with the club for one season. He then joined Radnik Surdulica in the summer of 2015, making his senior debut the following spring. In March 2018, Vasiljević extended his contract with the club for three more years, and soon established himself as the team's first-choice goalkeeper.

International career
In September 2018, Vasiljević was surprisingly called up by Mladen Krstajić to the Serbia national team to replace the injured Aleksandar Jovanović ahead of the team's UEFA Nations League games with Lithuania and Romania. He remained an unused substitute in both matches. Two months later, Vasiljević received his second call-up to the team, this time replacing the injured Marko Dmitrović for Serbia's final two Nations League fixtures versus Montenegro and Lithuania.

Statistics

References

External links
 

Association football goalkeepers
FK Radnički Niš players
FK Radnik Surdulica players
FK Sloboda Užice players
Red Star Belgrade footballers
FK Napredak Kruševac players
Serbian footballers
Serbian SuperLiga players
Sportspeople from Niš
1996 births
Living people